General elections were held in Greenland on 16 February 1999. Siumut remained the largest party in the Parliament, winning 11 of the 31 seats.

Results

References

Elections in Greenland
Greenland
1999 in Greenland